Akard station or Akard Street station is a DART Light Rail station in Dallas, Texas. It is located in the City Center District on Pacific Avenue, between Akard and Field Streets. It is also the nearest station to the DART headquarters, which was a former Sanger Harris department store built in 1965.

References

External links
 Dallas Area Rapid Transit - Akard Station

Dallas Area Rapid Transit light rail stations in Dallas
Railway stations in the United States opened in 1996
1996 establishments in Texas
Railway stations in Dallas County, Texas